Trevor Bamidele Davies  is a British mathematical physicist and science educator. His research is primarily concerned with spontaneous growth in a class of scalar-tensor theories involving techniques from non-linear dynamics, analytical mechanics and the parameterized post-Newtonian formalism.

Early life and education

Born in Eastbourne, East Sussex to Sierra Leone Creole parents, he attended London Metropolitan University and graduated with a BSc in chemistry followed by an MSc in astrophysics from Queen Mary University of London. For his PhD studies, he joined the Quantum Gravity & Gauge Group at the University of Aberdeen to work on a class of scalar-tensor theories that exhibit non-perturbative strong-field deviations away from general relativity in systems involving neutron stars.

Career and research
Between 2004 and 2009, Davies worked as a Lecturer at the Clapham campus of Lambeth College and the Maida Vale campus of City of Westminster College in London. In 2013, he pursued a new direction as an international educator after the UCL Teaching Fellowship in Physics was awarded by the Centre for Languages and International Education. He was subsequently posted to their overseas campus at Nazarbayev University in Nur-Sultan where he taught on the UCL University Preparatory Certificate program. In 2017 he was appointed as Associate Professor of Mathematics in the School of Arts and Sciences at the University of Central Asia and is one of the inaugural faculty members at the campus in Khorog.
 
Davies played a leading role in collaborative research on novel applications of scalar-tensor theory to the core-collapse supernova problem accounting for the apparent missing energy required to explain the observed powerful explosions. In cosmology, using the same framework, he developed a mechanism which allows the scalar field to be dynamically trapped, thus generating a scalar potential capable of driving primordial inflation.

Membership in academic associations
Institute of Mathematics and its Applications
Institute of Physics
Royal Astronomical Society

Selected publications

References

1972 births
Living people
Alumni of the University of Aberdeen
Alumni of Queen Mary University of London
Alumni of London Metropolitan University
Academics of University College London
Fellows of the Royal Astronomical Society
British expatriate academics
British people of Sierra Leone Creole descent
Sierra Leonean scientists
Physics educators